Hideo Kodama (born 1944) is a Japanese automobile designer.

Early life
He was born in Yokohama, the capital city of Kanagawa Prefecture, and in the Greater Tokyo Area. As a boy, he had often painted pictures of cars.

He studied at Tama Art University in Tokyo, studying in the Industrial Design department. He graduated in 1966.

Career

General Motors

He joined General Motors at Rüsselsheim am Main in Germany in 1966, which became the General Motors Europe subsidiary in 1986. The design studio had opened in 1964. He worked in Rüsselsheim with the main designer Erhard Schnell, and George Gallion, the deputy chief designer. By the early 1980s, he was Chief Designer, working with the designer Chris Bangle from 1981-85.

In 1992, he became Chief Designer for the new Corsa, known as the Corsa B. This car was launched in April 1993 in the UK, and four million were sold around the world. Kodama was also responsible for the design of the next generation Corsa, the Corsa C. His design for the Agila was built from 2000; the later models of that vehicle ceased production in 2014. He left General Motors Europe in 2004.

Personal life
He lives in Rhineland-Palatinate in Germany.

Design work 

 Opel Junior
 Opel Corsa B
 Opel Corsa C
 Opel Tigra

See also 
 Chris Svensson (1965-2018), designer of the 1990s Ford Ka
 International Technical Development Center in Germany
 Walter Röhrl, rally driver in GM vehicles in the early 1980s

References

External links
 Profile in 2014
 General Motors interview

1944 births
Living people
General Motors designers
Japanese automobile designers
Businesspeople from Mainz
People from Yokohama
Tama Art University alumni